Ettumanoor, sometimes spelled Ettumanur, is a major town and municipality in the Kottayam district of Kerala, India, located 11 kilometers north-east of Kottayam city, 50 kilometers south of Cochin, and 70 kilometers south of Cochin International Airport. The SH-1 popularly known as the Main Central (MC) Road, passes through Ettumanoor, and is a major connecting link between Pala and beyond, to the Western Ghats and to the commercial capital of Kerala - Kochi. Ettumanoor is en route to the tourist destinations at Wagamon and Poonjar.

Etymology 

The name of the place had its mythological origin from the word 'man oor' in Malayalam, which means the place of deer as 'maan' means deer and 'oor' means place. Another version is that the name originated from the 'Ettu Mana Ooru', ie, 'The Land of Eight Namboothiri Manas' or 'Ashta Grihas'. These Eight Manas (Brahmin families) are the original Ooralans of great  Ettumanoor Mahadeva Temple. Ettumanoor is a historical place as myths have said that the Pandavas and the sage Vyasa had established the famous Ettumanoor Mahadeva temple here.

Transportation

The town has two bus stands. A KSRTC station master office with bus station and a well built private bus stand. All Deluxe, Express and interstate buses stop here. Direct buses are available to all places including Bangalore, Mangalore, Theni, Cumbum, Velankanni, Palani, Madurai, Tuticorin, Kanyakumari, Salem and Coimbatore. The bus stands are close and a big market is sandwiched between the bus stands, this has made Ettumanoor a convenient shopping place. Two state highways are crossing each other in the town and another two are starting from the town. This makes the town an important changing point for the commuters.
Recent development in the nearby areas / start up of new institutions in the neighbour hood and easiness in conveyance has made the town the dearest location for migration. This has led to an increase in the population and change in demography.

Economy

Industrial Estate under the government of Kerala and Government of India Production center are major industrial centres in Ettumanoor. It is the only industrial estate in Kerala under the Ministry of Labor, Govt. of India. Rolling shutters, Bakery items, Rubber products, wood products etc. are main products.

Ettumanoor was the main centre of building material trade since the 1950s in central Travancore. N T Paul and company was established in 1946 in Ettumanoor. Nearby areas of the town like cheruvandoor, koodalloor and kothanallor are known for production of vegetables. Places in the east and south like kattachira and kandanchira are known for pottery and bricks. During first half of last century Ettumaoor was known for trading and some people like Hassan Rawther known as a trader.

There is one big fish market opening  daily from early morning of 4.00 AM behind Private Bus Stand stand of Ettumanoor town under the control of Ettumanoor Municipal Corporation. There is another big vegetable market functions at Peroor Junction of Ettumanoor. One Supplyco Kerala State Civil Supplies Corporation store also functions at Peroor Junction which offers consumable goods to public at subsidized prices.
There are number of Marriage halls like Sree Shylam, Nandavanam and Thomson Kaylas, functioning in Ettumanoor for arranging marriage functions. A newly constructed multiplex cinema theatre by United Global Media a.k.a. UGM Entertainments is located at Court Junction. The theatre is rated to have 4K projector system on one screen with seating capacity of @70, and another 2 screens with 2K projector system, which all of these are Dolby Atmos certified.

Education 

The Mahatma Gandhi University which was established on 2 October 1983 is situated in Athirampuzha  6.7 km southwest of the town. An industrial training institute called ITI, a Government Boys' H.S., Girls' model High School and a Teachers Training School and lower primary school are the government educational institutions and SFS Public School and Junior College, Shree Vidyadhiraja Higher Secondary School, Ebenezer International Residential School are the privately run ones. Town U.P.S School is Pvt. Aided and Established in 1918 is the oldest one. Colleges in Ettumanoor affiliated to M G University are the Mangalam Campus and Ettumanoorappan College, Ettumanoor. There is more than dozen of colleges and professional institutions in Ettumanoor constituency. Ettumanoor is the headquarters of Kerala Chuvar Chithra Kala Kendram (Govt. of Kerala).

Hospitals 

Government Medical College, Kottayam is located 6 km far away from Ettumanoor Town. Direct private and public buses are available from Ettumanoor to Kottayam Medical college. A Kerala Government well run general hospital is available at Ettumanoor nearby old Panchayth office for general treatments with free of cost.

Two private hospitals named Caritas Hospital and Matha Hospital are located within a 3 km radius from central junction towards Kottayam. Mitera hospital provides mother and child specific care, which is located at Thellakom.

Politics
Ettumanoor assembly constituency is part of Kottayam (Lok Sabha constituency).

The major political parties present in Ettumanoor are Indian National Congress, Communist Party of India (Marxist), Communist Party of India, Kerala Congress and Bharathiya Janatha Party. Presently the Ettumanoor Municipality is ruled by the Indian National Congress

Mahadeva Temple 

The ancient Ettumanoor Mahadevar Temple here has brought glory and fame to the place. Myths have it that the Pandavas and the sage Vyasa had worshipped at this temple. The name of the place had its origin from the word 'manoor', which means the home of deer.

The present temple building, with its gopuram and the fortress around it, was reconstructed in 717 ME (1542 AD). There are Dravidian mural paintings on the walls inside and outside of the main entrance. The fresco of Pradosha Nritham (Dance of Shiva) is one of the finest Wall painting  in India. There is a golden flag staff inside the temple. On the top of it is the idol of a bull surrounded by small bells and metal leaves of the banyan tree. The temple roofs are covered with copper sheets and it has 14 ornamental tops. Bhagavati, Sastha, Ganapathy and Yakshi are installed here as subordinate deities. It is believed that the great philosopher, Sankaracharya wrote the 'Soundaraya Lahari' staying in the temple.

Festivals

The famous Ettumanoor Mahadevar Temple hosts the arattu festival celebrated on a grand scale on the Thiruvathira day in February–March every year. Lot of people come to this temple on the 8th and 10th day of the festival when seven and half elephants (in Malayalam: ezharaponnaana) made of gold (nearly 13 kg) will be held in public view.this statue was donated to the temple by a travancore maharaja. The temple, the wealthiest Devaswom in Kerala, has many valuable possessions.

The Thulabharam is one of the important rituals of this temple. People make offerings to God for favours received. On balance, the child or man for whom offerings were promised to God, is weighed against offerings ranging from gold to fruits. Ettumanoor is an important pilgrim Centre of Hindus.

The history of origin of Ettumaanoorappan is from Kattampakk, a small village in Kottayam district.

Etumanoor was a temple town; so the great sage vyasa came to the temple as a mahamuni.

Ettumanur railway station

Ettumanoor railway station was the hub for steel supply for Idukki dams during its construction. Express trains like Venad Express and Parasuram express stop at the railway station. During festivals at Ettumanur temple, express trains like Vanchinad Express have special stops here.

Notable people 

 S. P. Pillai
 Ettumanoor Somadasan
 Dennis Joseph
 V. D. Rajappan
 Victor George

Gallery

References

External links 

 Details about services
 About Ettumanoor from Kerala Public Relations department

Cities and towns in Kottayam district
Suburbs of Kottayam